Dorcadion buresi is a species of beetle in the family Cerambycidae. It was described by Štěrba in 1922. It is known from Greece.

References

buresi
Beetles described in 1922